In theoretical computer science and network routing, Suurballe's algorithm is an algorithm for finding two disjoint paths in a nonnegatively-weighted directed graph, so that both paths connect the same pair of vertices and have minimum total length. The algorithm was conceived by John W. Suurballe and published in 1974. The main idea of Suurballe's algorithm is to use Dijkstra's algorithm to find one path, to modify the weights of the graph edges, and then to run Dijkstra's algorithm a second time. The output of the algorithm is formed by combining these two paths, discarding edges that are traversed in opposite directions by the paths, and using the remaining edges to form the two paths to return as the output.
The modification to the weights is similar to the weight modification in Johnson's algorithm, and preserves the non-negativity of the weights while allowing the second instance of Dijkstra's algorithm to find the correct second path.

The problem of finding two disjoint paths of minimum weight can be seen as a special case of a minimum cost flow problem, where in this case there are two units of "flow" and nodes have unit "capacity". Suurballe's algorithm, also, can be seen as a special case of a minimum cost flow algorithm that repeatedly pushes the maximum possible amount of flow along a shortest augmenting path.
The first path found by Suurballe's algorithm is the shortest augmenting path for the initial (zero) flow, and the second path found by Suurballe's algorithm is the shortest augmenting path for the residual graph left after pushing one unit of flow along the first path.

Definitions

Note: Node and Vertex are often used interchangeably.

Algorithm
Suurballe's algorithm performs the following steps:
 Find the shortest path tree  rooted at node  by running Dijkstra's algorithm (figure C).
According to the resulting modified cost function, all tree edges have a cost of 0, and non-tree edges have a non-negative cost. For example:  If , then   If , then 
 Find the shortest path  in the residual graph  by running Dijkstra's algorithm (figure E).
Return the two disjoint paths from the subgraph.

Example
The following example shows how Suurballe's algorithm finds the shortest pair of disjoint paths from A to F.
 

Figure A illustrates a weighted graph G.

Figure B calculates the shortest path P1 from A to F (A–B–D–F).

Figure C illustrates the shortest path tree T rooted at A, and the computed distances from A to every vertex.

Figure D shows the residual graph Gt with the updated cost of each edge and the edges of path P1 reversed.

Figure E calculates path P2 in the residual graph Gt (A–C–D–B–E–F).

Figure F illustrates both path P1 and path P2.

Figure G finds the shortest pair of disjoint paths by combining the edges of paths P1 and P2 and then discarding the common reversed edges between both paths (B–D). As a result, we get the two shortest pair of disjoint paths (A–B–E–F) and (A–C–D–F).

Correctness
Therefore, the shortest two disjoint paths under the modified weights are the same paths as the shortest two paths in the original graph, although they have different weights.

The modification to the weights does not affect the sequence of paths found by this method, only their weights. Therefore, the correctness of the algorithm follows from the correctness of the successive shortest paths method.

Analysis and running time
This algorithm requires two iterations of Dijkstra's algorithm. Therefore, the same time bound applies to Suurballe's algorithm.

Variations
The version of Suurballe's algorithm as described above finds paths that have disjoint edges, but that may share vertices. It is possible to use the same algorithm to find vertex-disjoint paths, by replacing each vertex by a pair of adjacent vertices, one with all of the incoming adjacencies   of the original vertex, and one with all of the outgoing adjacencies  . Two edge-disjoint paths in this modified graph necessarily correspond to two vertex-disjoint paths in the original graph, and vice versa, so applying Suurballe's algorithm to the modified graph results in the construction of two vertex-disjoint paths in the original graph. Suurballe's original 1974 algorithm was for the vertex-disjoint version of the problem, and was extended in 1984 by Suurballe and Tarjan to the edge-disjoint version.

By using a modified version of Dijkstra's algorithm that simultaneously computes the distances to each vertex  in the graphs , it is also possible to find the total lengths of the shortest pairs of paths from a given source vertex  to every other vertex in the graph, in an amount of time that is proportional to a single instance of Dijkstra's algorithm.

Note: The pair of adjacent vertices resulting from the split are connected by a zero cost uni-directional edge from the incoming to outgoing vertex. The source vertex becomes  and the destination vertex becomes .

See also
Edge disjoint shortest pair algorithm

References

Graph algorithms
Routing algorithms